Bianca Vidal is a Mexican telenovela produced by Valentín Pimstein for Televisa in 1982. Bianca Vidal was based on the soap opera María Salomé, original of Inés Rodena which was then elongated by Sacrificio de mujer from the same author.

Edith González and Salvador Pineda starred as protagonists, while Rocío Banquells starred as main antagonist.

Plot 
Bianca Vidal is a humble young lady who works during the day and studying at night, then meet his teacher of literature, José Miguel Medina Rivas. She feels strongly attracted to him, who inevitably deserves, but he tries to seduce her is Enrique, friend of the professor. José Miguel is committed to Monica a cruel woman that marries only because she is pregnant. When both are declared his love, this it becomes impossible, because Don Raúl, Miguel José's father, confesses that he is the real father of Bianca.

Cast 

Edith González as Bianca Vidal
Salvador Pineda as José Miguel Medina Rivas
Rocío Banquells as Mónica Rondán/Sandra/Meche
María Teresa Rivas as Doña Esther Monasterio de Medina Rivas
Christopher Lago Carreño as Rodolfito Medina Rivas Rondán †
Rafael Baledón as Don Raúl Medina Rivas
Aurora Molina as Ofelia #1
Blanca Torres as Ofelia #2
Oscar Bonfiglio as Patudo
Orlando Rodríguez as Ceferino Vidal
José Elías Moreno as Enrique Montes †
Dina de Marco as Guillermina
Beatriz Aguirre as Emilia †
Luciano Hernández de la Vega as Rodolfo  Medina Rivas †
Viviana Nuñez as Raquel Rinaldi
Juan Carlos Serrán as Alfonso
Jaime Garza as Mauricio Fonseca
Nuria Bages as Adriana Castro
Patricia Reyes Spindola as Cirila
Ada Carrasco as Vicenta
Aurora Clavel as Rosa
Pedro Damián as Gustavo
Pituka de Foronda as Eloisa
Rubén Rojo as Armando
Marco Muñoz as Ramiro Zerpa
Julieta Rosen as Chela
Alonso Iturralde as Humberto Carrillo
Beatriz Ornelas as Juanita
Arturo Lorca as Dr. Mario
Isabela Corona as Nana María
Alejandro Tomassi as Dr. Torres 
José Roberto Hill as Dr. Carlos Palacios
Alejandro Landero as Manuel
Luis Couturier as Dr. Ruiz
Eugenio Cobo as Dr. Millán
Luz Elena Silva as Felisa
Leandro Martínez as Arturo
Sergio Acosta as Adolfo Guzmán
Arturo Guízar as Lic. Rojas
Enrique Muñoz as Dr. Rivera
Aurora Cortés as Remedios Vidal
Manuel Guizar as Antonio
Tere Cornejo as Teresa Ramírez
Eduardo Díaz Reyna as Police
Margarita Cortés as Lucinda
Carmen Cortés as Dorinda
Janet Ruiz as Lupita
Ricardo de Loera as Luis
Fernando Ciangherotti as Dr. García
David Rencoret as Mesero
Raúl Marcelo as Ricardo
Estela Chacón as Arminda
Juan Antonio Marrón as Ricardo
Alicia Ravel as Mimí
Claudia Inchaurregui as Silvia
Arturo Peniche as Pedro
Tomás I. Jaime
Julio Monterde as Doctor
Leticia Calderón
Óscar Sánchez as Anselmo
María González as Fernanda
Magda Trillo as Magdalena
Lupelena Goyeneche as Presa
Antonio González as Inspector Calvo
Viviana Nunes as Raquel Rinaldi
Reynaldo Vallejos as Marcelo
Sandra Solimano as Francisca
Emilio Gaete as Don Raimundo Rinaldi
Liliana Ross as Doña Sofía de Rinaldi
Ramón Farías as Sebastián Echeñique
Paulina Nin de Cardona as Herself
Antonio Fendel
Claudia Castelvi

Awards

References

External links 

Mexican telenovelas
1983 telenovelas
Televisa telenovelas
Spanish-language telenovelas
1982 Mexican television series debuts
1983 Mexican television series endings